Guman Singh Damor (born 4 April 1957) is an Indian politician. He was elected to the Lok Sabha, lower house of the Parliament of India from Ratlam, Madhya Pradesh in the 2019 Indian general election as member of the Bharatiya Janata Party. He was earlier an elected representative in Madhya Pradesh Legislative Assembly from the Jhabua constituency.

References

External links
 Official biographical sketch in Parliament of India website

1957 births
Living people
India MPs 2019–present
Lok Sabha members from Madhya Pradesh
Bharatiya Janata Party politicians from Madhya Pradesh
Indian Hindus